Stephen "Steve" Hartley (birth unknown) is a former professional rugby league footballer who played in the 1970s and 1980s.

Playing career

Great Britain International - 1980, 1981

Challenge Cup Winner - 1979/80 (R/Up - 1980/81)

Rugby League Championship Winner- 1978/79, 1983/84, 1984/85 (R/Up - 1982/83)

John Player Trophy R/Up 1981/82

Rugby League Premiership Trophy Winner - 1980/81

BBC2 Trophy Winner - 1977/78

Yorkshire Cup R/Up - 1984/85

Rugby League Top Try Scorer - 1978/79

International honours
Steve Hartley won caps for Great Britain while at Hull Kingston Rovers in 1980 against New Zealand, and in 1981 against France (2 matches).

Challenge Cup Final Appearances
Steve Hartley played left- in Hull Kingston Rovers' 10-5 victory over Hull F.C. in the 1979–80 Challenge Cup Final during the 1979–80 season at Wembley Stadium, London on Saturday 3 May 1980, in front of a crowd of 95,000, and played  in the 9-18 defeat by Widnes in the 1980–81 Challenge Cup Final during the 1980–81 season at Wembley Stadium, London on Saturday 2 May 1981, in front of a crowd of 92,496.

County Cup Final Appearances
Steve Hartley played as an interchange/substitute, i.e. number 14, (replacing  Dave Hall) in Hull Kingston Rovers' 12-29 defeat by Hull F.C. in the 1984–85 Yorkshire County Cup Final during the 1984–85 season at Boothferry Park, Kingston upon Hull on Saturday 27 October 1984.

BBC2 Floodlit Trophy Final Appearances
Steve Hartley played , and scored a try in Hull Kingston Rovers' 26-11 victory over St. Helens in the 1977 BBC2 Floodlit Trophy Final during the 1977-78 season at Craven Park, Hull on Tuesday 13 December 1977.

John Player Trophy Final Appearances
Steve Hartley played  in Hull Kingston Rovers' 4-12 defeat by Hull F.C. in the 1981–82 John Player Trophy Final during the 1981–82 season at Headingley Rugby Stadium, Leeds on Saturday 23 January 1982.

Rugby League Premiership Trophy Final Appearances
Steve Hartley played , i.e. number 6, and scored a 80 yard try in Hull Kingston Rovers' 11-7 victory over Hull F.C. in the Final of the 1980-81 Rugby League Premiership during the 1980–81 season

1982 Australian Tour / 1983 Queensland Tour

Hartley played , i.e. number 6 in Hull Kingston Rovers' 30-10 defeat against the 1982 Kangaroos, memorably scoring one and making the other of Rovers two tries, Rovers were the only side to score more than one try against them.

Hartley played , i.e. number 6 in Hull Kingston Rovers' 8-6 victory over Queensland  as they toured Papua New Guinea and England during the 1983–84 Rugby Football League season

Nickname
Affectionately known to Rovers Supporters as 'The Dancer', there was no finer sight than seeing Hartley running onto the ball at pace with his head back gliding around opposition defenders.

Testimonial match
A benefit season/testimonial match for Steve Hartley and John Millington took place at Hull Kingston Rovers during the 1981–82 season, it raised £25,000 (based on increases in average earnings, this would be approximately £120,400 in 2018).

References

External links
Great Britain Statistics at englandrl.co.uk (statistics currently missing due to not having appeared for both Great Britain, and England)

Great Britain national rugby league team players
Hull Kingston Rovers players
Living people
Place of birth missing (living people)
Rugby league five-eighths
Year of birth missing (living people)